Bang Khen is one of the ten subdistricts (tambon) of Mueang Nonthaburi District, in Nonthaburi Province, Thailand. The subdistrict is bounded by (clockwise from north) Tha Sai, Thung Song Hong, Lat Yao, Wong Sawang, Suan Yai, Talat Khwan and Bang Kraso subdistricts. The whole area of the subdistrict is covered by Nonthaburi City Municipality. In 2020 it had a total population of 42,600 people.

References

External links
Website of Nonthaburi City Municipality

Tambon of Nonthaburi province
Populated places in Nonthaburi province